Amanita subjunquillea, also known as the East Asian death cap is a mushroom of the large genus Amanita, which occurs in East and Southeast Asia. Potentially deadly if ingested, it is closely related to the death cap A. phalloides.

Initially little reported, the toxicity of A. subjunquillea has been well established; a study in Korea revealed it to have similar effects to A. phalloides, namely delayed gastrointestinal symptoms, hepatotoxicity, and a 12.5% mortality. The species killed five people out of six who ingested them in Hebei, China, in 1994.

An all-white variety, Amanita subjunquillea var. alba is known from southwestern China, Japan, and Northern India.

See also

List of Amanita species
List of deadly fungus species

References

subjunquillea
Poisonous fungi
Deadly fungi
Fungi of Asia
Fungi of China
Fungi described in 1933
Taxa named by Sanshi Imai